Aymanam is a village in the Kottayam District of Kerala, India. It is about 4 km from the railway station in Kottayam along the road to Parippu, and 85 km from the Cochin International Airport. Aymanam is the setting for Arundhati Roy's 1997 novel The God of Small Things.

Demographics
 India census, Aimanam had a population of 34,985 with 17,268 males and 17,717 females.

Etymology
Ay means "five" in and Vanam means "forest" in Malayalam. Hence, Aymanam means "five forests", which, according to tradition, were Vattakkadu, Thuruthikkadu, Vallyakadu, Moolakkadu and Mekkadu. They survive today only as "snake groves", where fertility idols, in the form of snakes, were worshiped under the trees. Families depute Brahmin once a year for ritualistic offering.

Geography
Lake Vembanad lies to the west of the village, near Kumarakom, with the Meenachil River providing its water supply, which often floods from June to August due to regular monsoons. Consequently, two-thirds of the village are paddy fields.

The borders of the village are mostly delineated by rivers or canals, and include the villages of Arpookara, Kumara Nallooru, Thiruvarpu and Kumarakom, and the municipality of Kottayam.

Notable residents 
 Arundhati Roy - writer
 Aymanam John - writer
 N.N. Pillai - Drama and cinema artist.
 Vijayaraghavan (actor) - Malayalam movie actor.
 Mary Poonen Lukose - Surgeon General of India and state legislator of Travancore.

References

Villages in Kottayam district